The Executive of the Republic of Peru includes the President and 17 ministries:

See also
List of Peruvian Ministers

Government ministries of Peru